The Highwayman is an American action-adventure themed television series starring Sam J. Jones, set in "The Near Future." It was created by Glen A. Larson and Douglas Heyes. The pilot aired on September 1987 and was followed by a short-lived series of nine episodes, with significant changes to the cast and format, that ran from March until May 1988. It was summed up by many reviewers as a cross between Mad Max and Knight Rider.

Opening narration by William Conrad (all episodes after the pilot):
There is a world, just beyond now, where reality runs a razor-thin seam between fact and possibility; where the laws of the present collide with the crimes of tomorrow. Patrolling these vast outlands is a new breed of lawman, guarding the fringes of society’s frontiers, they are known simply as ‘Highwaymen’... and this is their story...

Synopsis 
The movie and subsequent series follow the adventures of "The Highwayman", one of a mysterious group conducting crime-fighting missions and solving bizarre mysteries. Each Highwayman in this group is equipped with a high-tech, multi-function truck.

The pilot movie used a different opening narration, also voiced by William Conrad:

They say he came into this world from someplace off the clock.
And his mother was an ice-cold wind; his pa a fiery rock.
It's told that on some starless nights, his rig could up and glow,
And folks who say they saw it coming swear they didn't see it go.
Now you hear a lot of legends told when you ride the long hard slab,
From some who say the man is good and some who say he's bad.
But all agreed who've ever tried to play a cheatin' hand;
You only get one chance to draw against "The Highwayman."

Most crimes in our society begin or end on some stretch of road, where laws often terminate at county lines. Combatting these legal blackouts is a new breed of lawman; working the fringes of society's frontiers, and known simply as Highwaymen. This is the story—and the legend—of one such man: The Highwayman.

The 1987 pilot movie starred Sam J. Jones. The lead character is more mysterious than any of the other Highwaymen in that his real name is never revealed (he is only known as "The Highwayman" or "Highway").  He drives a large, black, computerized truck with a bullet-shaped cabin, which is the nose of a concealed helicopter (an Aérospatiale Gazelle) that can detach from the rest of the truck. The truck can also operate in "stealth mode" to become invisible.  A concealed futuristic sports car (a Lotus Esprit) can emerge from the truck's rear. Some elements of the futuristic dashboard design were re-used from Knight Rider.

Claudia Christian co-starred as the Highwayman's liaison, Dawn, and Stanford Egi as technical wizard Mr. Toto. The pilot was retitled Terror on the Blacktop when shown as a stand-alone TV movie.

After the 1987 pilot film, only Jones returned for the weekly series. The retooling of the premise eliminated the truck's stealth mode, which was never mentioned again.  The Highwayman was joined by a new sidekick, Australian outback survival expert Jetto, played by Mark "Jacko" Jackson; Jane Badler as the Highwayman's boss, Ms. Tania Winthrop, and Tim Russ as D.C. Montana, who was responsible for the maintenance and modifications to the vehicles. The show was also filmed entirely on location in the American Southwest. Unusually, the show even switched production companies (the pilot was the last co-production between Glen Larson Productions and Twentieth Century Fox Television, the series was independently produced by Larson's New West Entertainment). (The name "D.C. Montana" is a pun on the name of D.C. Fontana, a famed TV scriptwriter who worked on many shows including Star Trek.)

After Jetto's truck, which was identical to the Highwayman's, was destroyed in the first episode, "Road Ranger", he is given his own, unique truck, the front half of which can separate into a futuristic car. The truck was later used in the first episode of Power Rangers Time Force.

The exact organization that the Highwayman and Jetto work for is never revealed in any great depth.

With much of the series featuring the Highwayman (and/or Jetto) driving their trucks along vast stretches of desert road, there are heavy modern-Western overtones to many episodes. With the hybrid vehicles and weaponry, the ordinary police unable to deal with many fragments of society, and the overall tone of the series, many of the episodes have a vaguely post-apocalyptic feel to them.

Despite its short run, the series was broadcast in various other countries including Germany, France, Indonesia, Italy, Mexico, the Philippines, South Africa, Brazil (SBT), the Netherlands, Pakistan (NTM), Peru, Sri Lanka and, the United Kingdom.

The original Highwayman truck (the one with the Gazelle helicopter cab) was designed and built by Jon Ward. It was restored and is currently owned by a mobile tattoo service called 'Highwaymen USA Ink' in Sulphur Springs, Texas. USA

Cast 
 Sam J. Jones as The Highwayman (a.k.a. "Highway")
 Claudia Christian as Dawn (pilot only)
 Stanford Egi as Mister Toto (pilot only)
 Mark "Jacko" Jackson as "Jetto" (credited on-screen as simply "Jacko")
 Jane Badler as Ms. Tania Winthrop
 Tim Russ as D.C. Montana
 William Conrad as the Narrator (uncredited)

Episodes 

Note, one episode was shown out of its intended order.  It is listed here in the intended order with explanatory notes.

Production number order, reflecting the order that the episodes began filming, does not match either the actual nor the intended airing order.

Date 
The series is at first vague on the exact year that it takes place. Other than Highway and Jetto's trucks, Highway's occasionally seen sports car (a silver Lotus Esprit) and Ms. Badler's car (a red Mark II Toyota MR2), the other vehicles are generally that of the era in which the series was filmed. Many of these vehicles, such as the Ford Motor Co.'s Aerostar minivan, were marketed at the time as having sleek, futuristic designs. It is generally indicated that the series takes place a couple of years after that in which it was made. A coin in the episode "Summer of 45" is said to be dated 1992. It is not until "Warzone" that the date is given on-screen as 1992 (October for that episode).

Weaponry 
The firearms carried by the Highwayman and Jetto are larger and more imposing than traditional police sidearms.
That carried by the Highwayman appears to be similar to a stockless 12-gauge semi-automatic shotgun with a sawed-off barrel, as used by SWAT teams and some military agencies. In the pilot movie, two sheriff's deputies debate the properties of the Highwayman's sidearm, its power finally demonstrated when a shot accidentally destroys part of the county police station in which the Highwayman is being held.
In the episode 'Til Death Duel Us Part', it is revealed that this weapon has selectable 'modes' and is capable of firing both 9mm Parabellum and 20mm high-explosive ammunition.
The sidearm carried by Jetto is a stockless, full-length Heckler & Koch MP5 submachine gun.

See also 
 Airwolf
 Automan
 Blue Thunder
 Knight Rider
 Street Hawk
 Viper

References

External links 
  (pilot)
  (series)
 Opening credits (video)
 The Highwayman truck now 
 The Steinwinter truck – basis for Jetto's truck (in Russian)

1980s American science fiction television series
NBC original programming
Fictional helicopters
1987 American television series debuts
1988 American television series endings
Television series by 20th Century Fox Television
Television series created by Glen A. Larson
Fiction about invisibility
American action adventure television series
Television shows set in New York City